Himalayan is the third studio album by the British rock band Band of Skulls, released on 31 March 2014 through Electric Blues Records.

Track listing

Personnel
Russel Marsden – vocals, guitar
Emma Richardson – bass guitar, vocals
Matt Hayward – drums
Nick Launay – producer, engineer, mixing
Adam Greenspan – engineer
Bernie Grundman – mastering

Charts

References

2014 albums
Band of Skulls albums